Lena Willemark (born 12 May 1960) is a Swedish traditional music fiddler, singer, and composer, who combines elements of folk and jazz.

Born in Älvdalen, Dalarna, Willemark grew up with the region's folk music. In Stockholm in the 1970s, she also had contact with jazz. She has collaborated with groups such as Frifot, Enteli, Elise Einarsdotter, and composer Karin Rehnqvist. She recorded Nordan with Ale Möller, winning in 1994 both a Grammis and the Preis der Deutschen Schallplattenkritik. Commissioned by Stockholm, Cultural Capital of Europe in 1998, she composed and performed Windogur.

For several decades Willemark has broadened her scope through collaborations with jazz musicians and other artists. She is also a member of the Royal Swedish Academy of Music and is often seen on stage across Sweden and abroad.

Discography 
 Lena Willemark När som gräset det vajar, 1989
 Lena Willemark/Ale Möller/Per Gudmundsson Frifot, 1991
 Frifot with Kirsten Bråten-Berg, Musique des vallées scandinaves (Suède - Norvège), 1993
 Lena Willemark/Ale Möller Nordan, 1994 (ECM)
 Enteli Enteli, 1994
 Elise Einardotter Ensemble Senses, 1995
 Ale Möller Hästen och Tranan, 1996
 Lena Willemark/Ale Möller Agram, 1996 (ECM)
 Frifot Järven, 1996
 Enteli Live, 1997
 Frifot Frifot, 1999 (ECM)
 Lena Willemark Windogur, 2000
 Frifot Sluring, 2003
 Lena Willemark Älvdalens Elektriska, 2006
 Frifot Flyt, 2007
 Trees of Light, 2015 - with Anders Jormin and Karin Nakagawa

Willemark also appears on a number of other recordings and compilations, including:

 Hector Zazou Songs from the Cold Seas, 1994
 Johan Hedin Angel Archipelago, 1998
 Groupa Månskratt, 1990
 Rita Marcotulli, Koinè, 2002
 Anders Jormin In Winds, In Light (ECM), 2003 (ECM)
 Kirsten Bråten Berg Stemmenes skygge (Heilo), with Marilyn Mazur, 2005
 Various artists Finlir och Gold (compilation)
 Various artists Varjehanda folkmusik (Musica Sveciae 3)
 Various artists Lockrop & vallåtar (Musica Sveciae 8)
 Various artists Blod, lik & tårar (Musica Sveciae 19)
 Various artists Folkmusik i förvandling (Musica Sveciae 25)
 Various artists Visfolk och tralltokar
 Various artists Carl Michael Bellman
 Various artists Folksamling

References

External links 
 
 Stemmenes Skygge review 2005 
 Lena Willemark touchemusic.se
 New vocal traditions old.visarkiv.se

1960 births
Living people
Fiddlers from Sweden
Swedish fiddlers
Heilo Music artists
21st-century violinists